Yarmouth County is a rural county in the Canadian province of Nova Scotia. It has both traditional Anglo-Scottish and Acadian French culture as well as significant inland wilderness areas, including over 365 lakes and several major rivers. It comprises three municipalities: the Town of Yarmouth, the Municipality of the District of Yarmouth, and the Municipality of the District of Argyle.

History
The name Yarmouth first appeared as a projected township in Nova Scotia in 1759. There is some speculation it was named after Yarmouth, Massachusetts, as some of the earliest English settlers arrived from Cape Cod on 9 June 1761. It is more likely the township was named after Lady Yarmouth, a mistress of King George II.

Originally the area was part of Lunenburg County. In 1761 it became part of Queens County; in 1784 it became part of Shelburne County and finally became a county on its own in 1836. The description of Yarmouth County was modified in 1846. It was then divided into two districts for court sessional purposes in 1856 – Yarmouth and Argyle. These two districts were subsequently incorporated as district municipalities in 1879. The county was a major international shipbuilding centre in the 19th century, producing hundreds of ships including the namesake County of Yarmouth in 1884.

In the second half of the 19th century, Yarmouth was the site of the creation of the Nova Scotia Duck Tolling Retriever.

Geography
The only town in the county is Yarmouth, which is one of three municipalities that comprise the county. The others are the Municipality of the District of Yarmouth and the Municipality of the District of Argyle.  There are no incorporated villages in the county. The county also includes the Acadia First Nations, Yarmouth Reserve 33.

Communities

Towns
Yarmouth

Reserves
Yarmouth 33

District municipalities
Municipality of the District of Argyle
Municipality of the District of Yarmouth

Demographics 

Population trend

Mother tongue language (2016)

Ethnic groups (2006)

Income (2006)

Notable people
Edgar Archibald (1885–1968), agricultural scientist
Lucy Anne Rogers Butler (1841–1906), writer and social justice advocate
Zach Churchill (b. 1984), Canadian politician
Ryan Graves (b. 1995), Hockey player for the New Jersey Devils
List of communities in Nova Scotia
List of schools in Nova Scotia

References